The 1994 season was the 89th season of competitive football in Norway.

Men's football

League season

Promotion and relegation

Tippeligaen

1. divisjon

Group 1

Group 2

2. divisjon

Norwegian Cup

Final

Women's football

League season

1. divisjon

Norwegian Women's Cup

Final
Trondheims-Ørn 5–1 Donn

UEFA competitions

UEFA Cup Winners' Cup

Qualifying round

|}

First round

|}

UEFA Cup

Preliminary round

|}

First round

|}

National teams

Norway men's national football team

Source:

Friendlies

1994 FIFA World Cup

Group E

Matches

Norway women's national football team

Results

References

External links
  Norge Menn Senior A, Football Association of Norway 1908–present
 RSSSF.no – National team 1994

 
Seasons in Norwegian football